Norsecurinine is a securinega alkaloid from Phyllanthus niruri.

See also 
 Securinine

References 

Alkaloids
Tetracyclic compounds
Nitrogen heterocycles
Lactones
Furanones
Cyclohexenes